The Virgin and Child with the Young Saint John the Baptist is a painting of  by the Italian Renaissance painter Sandro Botticelli and his workshop. It is housed in the Cleveland Museum of Art.

The United States Postal Service used the painting for a 2008 Christmas stamp.

Attribution 
There has been some dispute as to whether Botticelli or his pupil, Filippino Lippi, produced this work. The painting is generally attributed to Botticelli, as it is similar to his other works of the time.  The Cleveland Museum of Art attributes the painting to Botticelli and his workshop.

References

Paintings of the Madonna and Child by Sandro Botticelli
Paintings in the collection of the Cleveland Museum of Art
Paintings depicting John the Baptist